Svärtinge SK is a Swedish football club located in Svärtinge.

Background
Svärtinge SK currently plays in Division 5 Östergötland Östra which is the seventh tier of Swedish football. They play their home matches at the Billbäcks Arena in Svärtinge.

The club is affiliated to Östergötlands Fotbollförbund. Svärtinge SK played in the 2011 Svenska Cupen but lost 1–9 at home to Enskede IK in the preliminary round.

Season to season

Footnotes

External links
 Svärtinge SK – Official website

Sport in Östergötland County
Football clubs in Östergötland County
1949 establishments in Sweden